Olga Adellach Coma  (born 16 March 1966) is an Andorran politician. She is a member of the Liberal Party of Andorra.

External links
Page at the General Council of the Principality of Andorra

Members of the General Council (Andorra)
1966 births
Living people
Andorran women in politics
Liberal Party of Andorra politicians
21st-century women politicians
Place of birth missing (living people)